The Arab Towns Organization (ATO) is a network which exists to develop cooperation between Arab cities in order to promote their development, while preserving their Arab identity.

History and profile
ATO was set up in Kuwait on 15 March 1967. It is based in Kaifan, Kuwait City.

Membership is open to municipalities, from  Arab nations,  other institutions with related activities and interested individuals. Member cities, according to the website (in 2008), come from the following countries :  Algeria, Bahrain,  Comoros,  Djibouti,  Egypt,  Iraq,  Jordan,  Kuwait,  Lebanon,  Libya,  Mauritania,  Morocco, Oman,  Palestine,  Qatar,  Saudi Arabia,  Somalia,  Sudan,  Syria, Tunisia,  United Arab Emirates and  Yemen.
There are several related institutions, including a Development Fund for Arab Cities, which began life in 1979, and the Arab Urban Development Institute which started up in 1980, describing itself as ‘the scientific and technical wing of the ATO’. As of 2013, the organization had members from twenty-two countries.

ATO is one of the main partners in the Euro-Arab Forum, which has organised conferences in Dubai in 2008 and Malaga in 2011. The other partners are COPPEM, CEMR and the Congress of the Council of Europe.

As of 2011 the ATO Secretary General was Abdulaziz Al Adasani. He was re-elected in 2010 for another three-year term, at the 15th ATO General Assembly in Kuwait in October 2010. A decision was taken at this meeting to hold the 16th Assembly in Aleppo in 2012.

See also
List of micro-regional organizations

References

External links
  Arab Towns Organization website
 ATO approves soft loans for  Arab cities 5/7/2006
 ATO to participate in November 2008 World Urban Forum in Nanjing

1967 establishments in Kuwait
Organizations established in 1967
Local government organizations
International political organizations
International organizations based in the Middle East
Arab groups
Arab League
Organizations based in Kuwait City
Arab organizations
Municipal international relations